The Taiyuan–Jiaozuo high speed railway is a high-speed railway in China. The travel time between Taiyuan and Zhengzhou is expected to be reduced to two hours. The line connects to the Zhengzhou–Jiaozuo intercity railway at its southern end.

History
Trial operations began in November 2020. The line opened on 12 December.

Stations
The line has the following stations:
Taiyuan South
Jinzhong
Taigu East
Yushe West
Wuxiang West
Xiangyuan East
Changzhi East
Changzhi South
Gaoping East
Jincheng East
Jiaozuo West
Jiaozuo

See also
Taiyuan–Jiaozuo railway

References

High-speed railway lines in China
Railway lines opened in 2020